Events in the year 1918 in China.

Incumbents
 President of the Republic of China — Feng Guozhang
 Warlord Era

Events

January
 January 17 — USS Monocacy incident was an attack on the American gunboat  in January 1918 by Chinese soldiers along the Yangtze River. It was one of many incidents at the time involving armed Chinese firing on foreign vessels.

February
 January 13 — 1918 Shantou earthquake occurred in Shantou, Kwangtung, Republic of China. It also caused some damage in what was then British Hong Kong.

March
 March 8 — Wang Yitang and Xu Shuzheng established the Anfu Club.
 March 23 — Duan Qirui resigns as Premier of the Republic of China.

August
 August 12 — Wang Yitang elect Xu Shichang to the presidency in the 1918 presidential election. (1918 Republic of China National Assembly election)

October
 October 10 — Duan Qirui left as Premier of the Republic of China.

References

 
1910s in China